Bad Science: The Short Life and Weird Times of Cold Fusion is book of science history by Gary Taubes about the early years (1989–1991) of the cold fusion controversy.

Overview
This text is not a scholarly work, but a popular retelling of the events, based on interviews with over 260 people. The book presents a timeline of the events, making the case that the cold fusion field has many examples of poorly performed science. The actions of Martin Fleischmann, Stanley Pons, and Steven E. Jones, the scientists who made the dramatic first claims of fusion, are described in rich detail. The book then shows the worldwide reaction and later disrepute of the cold fusion field, with Taubes placing himself in the side of "good science". Taubes says at the end that cold fusion had only demonstrated that research can continue even if the phenomenon doesn't actually exist, as long as there is funding available. Taubes had previously written an article for Science in which he insinuates that the cold fusion work of A&M University was fraudulent.

Reception

The book received a positive review in American Journal of Physics. While observing that the book was "readable, suspenseful, and insightful", the reviewer criticized it for including too many footnotes (over 300), some of which were deemed unimportant.

References

Bibliography
 
 
 
 

1993 non-fiction books
American history books
Popular physics books
Cold fusion
History books about science
20th-century history books